Group A of the 2001 Fed Cup Europe/Africa Zone Group II was one of four pools in the Europe/Africa zone of the 2001 Fed Cup. Five teams competed in a round robin competition, with the top team advancing to Group I for 2002.

Georgia vs. Malta

Latvia vs. Ireland

Georgia vs. Latvia

Ireland vs. Malta

Georgia vs. Ireland

Latvia vs. Malta

  placed first in this group and thus advanced to Group I for 2002, where they placed third in their pool of four.

See also
Fed Cup structure

References

External links
 Fed Cup website

2001 Fed Cup Europe/Africa Zone